The 1972 Cal State Hayward Pioneers football team represented California State University, Hayward—now known as California State University, East Bay—as a member of the Far Western Conference (FWC) during the 1972 NCAA College Division football season. Led by second-year head coach Bob Rodrigo, Cal State Hayward compiled an overall record of 2–8 with a mark of 2–3 in conference play, tying for third third in the FWC. The team was outscored by its opponents 348 to 168 for the season. The Pioneers played home games at Pioneer Stadium in Hayward, California.

Schedule

References

Cal State Hayward
Cal State Hayward Pioneers football seasons
Cal State Hayward Pioneers football